Ragnarok is the third full-length album by the Faroese viking/folk metal band Týr. It was released on 22 September 2006 by Napalm Records.

The album is bilingual with Faroese and English lyrics.  The album features cover art by Jan Yrlund.

Track listing

Credits
Heri Joensen – vocals, guitar
Terji Skibenæs – guitar
Gunnar H. Thomsen – bass
Kári Streymoy – drums

References

External links
 mp3 sample of "Wings of Time"

2006 albums
Týr (band) albums
Concept albums
Napalm Records albums